Hooley Station is a pastoral lease that was once a sheep station but now operates as a cattle station in Western Australia.

The station was owned in 2008 by Peter Cook, a pharmacist, who owned other properties in the Pilbara including Croydon, Mallina, Pyramid and Sherlock Stations.

In 2017 the property was owned by the Peter and Pol Edmunds, who once owned Mandora Station.

See also
List of ranches and stations
List of pastoral leases in Western Australia

References

Pastoral leases in Western Australia
Stations (Australian agriculture)
Homesteads in Western Australia
Pilbara